Azur Air Ukraine, until October 2015 UTair-Ukraine, is a Ukrainian charter airline based at Boryspil International Airport. It used to be a subsidiary of Russian UTair Aviation. In October 2015, it has been announced that tour operator Anex Tours would acquire UTair-Ukraine from UTair Aviation.

History

UTair-Ukraine (2008–2015) 
Founded in 2008, UTair-Ukraine was set up as the Ukrainian subsidiary of Russian parent company, UTair Aviation, to serve domestic and international destinations.

Azur Air Ukraine (2015–present) 
In October 2015, it was announced that tour operator Anex Tours would acquire UTair-Ukraine from UTair Aviation with the aim to rebrand it to Azur Air Ukraine as a leisure charter carrier. UTair Ukraine already shifted its focus from domestic services to leisure operations earlier and therefore phased out several planes. The sale and rebranding was confirmed shortly after. A few weeks later, Anex also bought the Russian Azur Air which the "new" Ukrainian Azur Air is now a sister company of.

Destinations

As of November 2018, Azur Air Ukraine serves the following charter destinations:

Fleet
The Azur Air Ukraine fleet comprises the following aircraft (as of August 2022):

Although Azur Air Ukraine rebranded in 2015, select Boeing 737-800s in their fleet still fly with red Azur Air (Russia) liveries, from their Russian sister airline, with a 'Ukraine' marking painted on them for distinction.

References

External links

Airlines of Ukraine
Airlines established in 2008
Ukrainian companies established in 2008